The 2013 Tampa Bay Storm season was the 26th season for the franchise in the Arena Football League, and their 22nd in the Tampa Bay area. The team was coached by Dave Ewart and played their home games at the Tampa Bay Times Forum. The Storm lost their last seven regular season games but were still able to qualify for the playoffs. However, they were eliminated in the conference semifinals by the Jacksonville Sharks by a score of 69–62.

Final roster

Standings

Schedule

Regular season
The Storm began the season by hosting the Jacksonville Sharks on March 23. They closed the regular season against the Sharks in Jacksonville on July 27.

Playoffs

References

Tampa Bay Storm
Tampa Bay Storm seasons
Tampa Bay Storm